Frankenstein: The True Story is a 1973 British television movie loosely based on the 1818 novel Frankenstein; or, The Modern Prometheus by Mary Shelley. It was directed by Jack Smight, and the screenplay was written by novelist Christopher Isherwood and his longtime partner Don Bachardy.

The film stars Leonard Whiting as Victor Frankenstein, Jane Seymour as Prima, David McCallum as Henry Clerval, James Mason as Dr. Polidori and Michael Sarrazin as the Creature. James Mason's wife Clarissa Kaye-Mason appeared in the film.

Plot

Victor Frankenstein (Leonard Whiting) is a newly trained doctor, engaged to Elizabeth Fanshawe (Nicola Pagett). After Victor's younger brother, William, drowns, Victor renounces God and declares his ideal of being able to restore his brother to life.

Victor leaves the Fanshawe estate for further medical training. He meets Henry Clerval (David McCallum), who has discovered how to restore dead matter to life. Clerval reveals his ultimate plan: to create a new race of perfect beings created from corpses. Clerval persuades Frankenstein to help and the lab is soon completed.

Seven peasant laborers have been killed in a local mining accident. The doctors exhume the bodies and use various parts of all to create a single perfect body. Clerval is shocked to discover that an amputated arm he had re-animated earlier has greatly deteriorated, but suffers a heart attack and dies before completing his journal entry.

The next morning, Victor finds Clerval's body and misreads the incomplete journal entry as a sign of success, then transplants Clerval's brain into their creation.

Victor soon introduces his creation (Michael Sarrazin) into high-class London society, passing him off as a friend from a far-off country with little grasp of English. Shortly thereafter, Victor discovers the now-repulsive arm in Clerval's laboratory cabinet and realises there is a flaw in the process. He destroys the deformed arm, but sees the same problem now irreversibly affecting the Creature. After Victor's landlady, Mrs. Blair (Agnes Moorehead), dies from shock from seeing the Creature, Victor retreats with him to the laboratory. He contemplates destroying the Creature, but cannot bring himself to do it. The Creature discovers his deformed appearance and unsuccessfully attempts suicide. He then flees the laboratory and jumps into the sea. Victor assumes the Creature is dead and realises that perhaps it is for the best.

The Creature washes up on a beach, unharmed, and soon befriends an elderly blind peasant (Ralph Richardson). The blind man is eager to introduce his new friend to his granddaughter Agatha (Jane Seymour) and her husband Felix (Dallas Adams), but the Creature hides. He observes the family from afar and falls in love with Agatha. When Agatha and Felix return home unexpectedly one morning, they encounter the Creature and react in horror. Felix is killed by the Creature and Agatha, fleeing in terror, is struck by a carriage and is also killed.

The Creature takes Agatha's body back to the laboratory, intent on asking Victor to restore her to life. He arrives to find that Victor has left and the laboratory is now occupied by Dr. Polidori (James Mason), Clerval's former mentor. Polidori, aware of the Creature's origins, plans to force Victor to help him create another creature. In the meantime, Victor has abandoned his experiments and married Elizabeth. He is confronted by Polidori, who blackmails him into assisting with his procedure.

Polidori claims that he was the one who perfected the reanimation of dead flesh, secrets stolen by Clerval. He rejects Clerval's use of solar power in favour of his own chemical reanimation process. Victor attaches Agatha's head to a new body and they reanimate a female creature, whom Polidori names Prima. Victor leaves for his honeymoon with Elizabeth.

While Victor and Elizabeth are away, Polidori persuades Elizabeth's family to take Prima in as a house guest. When the couple returns, it becomes evident that Prima is completely insane, and Elizabeth begs Victor to send her away. At the laboratory, Victor confronts Polidori, who agrees to leave with Prima as soon as she has become an established member of society. Before they leave the laboratory, Polidori attempts to destroy the original Creature by having two of his assistants push him into a vat of acid as he sleeps, but Victor stops them. The enraged Creature throws one of the assistants into the acid bath as the others make their escape. Polidori locks the Creature in the laboratory and sets the building on fire, resulting in a series of huge explosions.

A few days later, a lavish ball is held at the Fanshawe mansion to present Prima to the social elite. Prima delights the guests, and Polidori reveals his plan to use her as a courtesan to gain international political influence. Suddenly, the badly burned Creature bursts into the ballroom and confronts Prima, who attacks him. He decapitates her and throws the head at Polidori's feet as the surviving guests flee. Weeping, Victor asks the Creature why he has done this. The Creature gently responds and exits into the night.

The next morning, Victor and Elizabeth are questioned by the local constable. They learn Polidori has suffered a nervous breakdown and admitted to reanimating Prima. Victor admits to fashioning the Creature from bodies, but Elizabeth convinces the constable that her husband is deluded and the police leave. Elizabeth persuades Victor to travel to America in order to begin a new life.

After setting sail, Victor and Elizabeth are dismayed to discover that Polidori is also on the ship. Polidori tries to convince Victor to resume the experiments. Unknown to all, the Creature has stowed away and soon emerges from a lifeboat, looking for Victor. Elizabeth sees the Creature hiding in Polidori's cabin and locks the two of them together in the room. Clerval's mind has resurfaced in the Creature and he is determined to have his revenge on Polidori. Victor unlocks the door and as the ship's captain and crew become involved, the conflict moves to the upper deck. The Creature ties Polidori to the top of a mast, where he is killed by a lightning strike. Victor, attempting to climb the mast to reason with the Creature, is knocked unconscious and falls to the deck. The crew members flee in a lifeboat and the Creature takes Victor below deck to care for him.

The Creature lashes the wheel of the ship on a heading straight for the North Pole. In Victor's cabin, Elizabeth cruelly repudiates the Creature, who (his mind now that of Clerval) then strangles her. As Victor remains unconscious below deck, the Creature maintains the course to the north. When Victor awakens, he finds the frozen body of Elizabeth on deck and the ship locked in ice. He follows the Creature to an ice cave, where he confesses that the entire tragedy was caused by his rejection of the helpless, deteriorating Creature. He also knows that, upon his death, the Creature will be utterly alone, cursed with an "iron body" that will keep him alive against his will. As Victor begs the Creature's forgiveness, the sound of his shouts sets off an ice avalanche. As tons of ice begin to fall upon them both, the Creature (in Clerval's voice) forgives his creator, who laughs as he realizes that their ordeal is at an end.

Cast

Production
The character of Dr. Polidori, who did not appear in the original novel, was based on the character of Dr. Pretorius from Universal Pictures Bride of Frankenstein, but named after the real-life John Polidori, an acquaintance of author Mary Shelley who was part of the competition that produced her novel. Polidori's own contribution was the first modern vampire story The Vampyre (1819).

A notable feature of the production is that, instead of being ugly from the start, the Creature is portrayed as physically beautiful, but then becoming increasingly hideous as the film progresses. The make-up was by Hammer horror veteran artist Roy Ashton.

It was broadcast on NBC in late 1973 in two 90-minute parts, but often is seen edited into a single film. Its DVD debut date was September 26, 2006. Included at the beginning is a short introduction featuring James Mason wandering through St John's Wood churchyard, London. He suggests that this is where Mary Shelley is buried, which is incorrect (she is in fact buried in the family plot in Dorset) despite standing beside a gravestone bearing her name.

The film's development and production has been detailed extensively in Little Shoppe of Horrors #38 - which was released in June 2017 - by film director/historian Sam Irvin, who served as guest editor on this issue.

Tie-in novel
The script for the film by Don Bachardy and Christopher Isherwood was published in paperback as a movie tie-in novel.  The script contains a prologue in which Mary Shelley is telling her tale of horror to Percy Shelley and Lord Byron, as Dr. Polidori sulks nearby. As she reaches their parts in the tale, they rush to join the main action and the story proper begins.  Some shots in the film indicate that at least part of this prologue may have been filmed.  If this segment had been included, it would have featured Nicola Pagett as Mary, Leonard Whiting as Shelley, David McCallum as Byron, and James Mason as Polidori.

The script contains an epilogue following the avalanche: The season changes, and the northern ice begins to break apart. The Creature's body, still entombed in the remainder of the iceberg, begins to float south into warmer waters. As the ice melts, one of his hands is exposed. Absorbing the rays of the sun, the hand responds, flower-like, and slowly begins to open.

See also
 List of films featuring Frankenstein's monster

References

External links

1973 television films
American science fiction horror films
American television films
American horror television films
Films based on horror novels
Films set in the Arctic
Frankenstein films
British science fiction television films
Films set in London
Films directed by Jack Smight
Films scored by Gil Mellé
British television films